The 2010 European Taekwondo Championships was held at the Yubileyny Sports Palace in Saint Petersburg, Russia, from May 12 to May 15, 2010.

Medal table

Medal summary

Men

Women

References

External links 
 European Taekwondo Union

European Taekwondo Championships
International sports competitions hosted by Russia
2010 in European sport
2010 in taekwondo
2010 in Russian sport